Humboldt Township may refer to the following places in the United States:

 Humboldt Township, Coles County, Illinois
 Humboldt Township, Humboldt County, Iowa
 Humboldt Township, Allen County, Kansas
 Humboldt Township, Michigan
 Humboldt Township, Clay County, Minnesota
 Humboldt Township, Minnehaha County, South Dakota

Township name disambiguation pages